Poshkent (Russian and Tajik: Пошкент) is a village and jamoat in north-western Tajikistan. It is part of the city of Istaravshan in Sughd Region. The jamoat has a total population of 19,746 (2015).

Notes

References

 Populated places in Sughd Region
 Jamoats of Tajikistan